Dolf Broese van Groenou (4 January 1880 – 19 May 1961) was a Dutch architect. His work was part of the architecture event in the art competition at the 1924 Summer Olympics.

References

1880 births
1961 deaths
19th-century Dutch architects
20th-century Dutch architects
Olympic competitors in art competitions
People from Yogyakarta